The Chester and Crewe Railway was an early British railway company absorbed by the Grand Junction Railway in 1840. The company built the section Chester–Crewe of the North Wales Coast line,  in length, the engineer was Robert Stephenson and the contractor for the work was Thomas Brassey.  It was the absorption of this company that led the Grand Junction Railway to building its locomotive works at Crewe, which led to Crewe becoming a major railway town.

References

Further reading

Grand Junction Railway
Early British railway companies
Railway companies disestablished in 1840
Standard gauge railways in England
British companies disestablished in 1840